The generalised hyperbolic distribution (GH) is a continuous probability distribution defined as the normal variance-mean mixture where the mixing distribution is the generalized inverse Gaussian distribution (GIG). It was introduced by Ole Barndorff-Nielsen, who studied it in the context of physics of wind-blown sand.

Properties

Linear transformation

This class is closed under affine transformations.

Summation

Barndorff-Nielsen and Halgreen proved that the GIG distribution is infinitely divisible and since the GH distribution can be obtained as a normal variance-mean mixture where the mixing distribution is the generalized inverse Gaussian distribution, Barndorff-Nielsen and Halgreen showed the GH distribution is infinitely divisible as well.

Fails to be convolution-closed

An important point about infinitely divisible distributions is their connection to Lévy processes, i.e. at any point in time a Lévy process is infinitely divisible distributed. Many families of well-known infinitely divisible distributions are so-called convolution-closed,  i.e. if the distribution of a Lévy process at one point in time belongs to one of these families, then the distribution of the Lévy process at all points in time belong to the same family of distributions. For example, a Poisson process will be Poisson distributed at all points in time, or a Brownian motion will be normally distributed at all points in time. However, a Lévy process that is generalised hyperbolic at one point in time might fail to be generalized hyperbolic at another point in time. In fact, the generalized Laplace distributions and the normal inverse Gaussian distributions are the only subclasses of the generalized hyperbolic distributions that are closed under convolution.

Related distributions 

As the name suggests it is of a very general form, being the superclass of, among others, the Student's t-distribution, the Laplace distribution, the hyperbolic distribution, the normal-inverse Gaussian distribution and the variance-gamma distribution.

  has a Student's t-distribution with  degrees of freedom.
  has a hyperbolic distribution.

  has a normal-inverse Gaussian distribution (NIG).
  normal-inverse chi-squared distribution
  normal-inverse gamma distribution (NI)
  has a variance-gamma distribution
  has a Laplace distribution with location parameter  and scale parameter 1.

Applications 

It is mainly applied to areas that require sufficient probability of far-field behaviour, which it can model due to its semi-heavy tails—a property the normal distribution does not possess.  The generalised hyperbolic distribution is often used in economics, with particular application in the fields of modelling financial markets and risk management, due to its semi-heavy tails.

References

Continuous distributions